Enjoy is a 2022 Indian Tamil-language romantic comedy film directed by Perumal Kasi and starring Madan Kumar, Vignesh and Harish Kumar in the lead roles. It was released on 23 December 2022.

Cast

Reception
The film was released on 23 December 2022 across Tamil Nadu. A critic from the Filmibeat entertainment portal noted the film was a good watch, rating it 3.5 out of 5 stars. A reviewer from the Thinaboomi newspaper gave the film a mixed review, though cited that "it may be an interesting watch for youngsters. A critic from ChennaiVision wrote that Perumal Kasi "has conveyed an important message at the climax. The director has designed the characters in such a way that they convey the message effectively". Critic Malini Mannath noted it was "a promising debut from a first time maker, ‘Enjoy’ offers much more than what one would have expected from a film by a debutant maker and his cast of freshers."

References

External links

2022 films
2020s Tamil-language films
Indian romantic comedy films